Al-Qotah Club  is a Saudi Arabian football (soccer) team in Ha'il playing at the Saudi Third Division.

Current squad

References

Qotah
1967 establishments in Saudi Arabia
Association football clubs established in 1967
Football clubs in Mawqaq